Peter Linz (born June 28, 1967) is an American puppeteer. His most prominent role is being the performer for the character Walter who was introduced in the 2011 feature film The Muppets. Since 1991, Linz has performed on Sesame Street, where he later took on the roles of Herry Monster and Ernie on Sesame Street in 2017. Linz recounts receiving the role of Walter as his favorite; "Apart from my wedding day and birth of my children, being cast as Walter was one of the greatest moments of my life. I was beyond happiness."

He has performed many characters on children's television shows: perhaps some of his best known performing roles are Snook in It's a Big Big World, Tutter and Pip in Bear in the Big Blue House, Pooh in The Book of Pooh, Tizzy on Squeak! (season 1), and Theo Lion in Between the Lions, though he has also performed in Blue's Room, Sesame Street, and The Puzzle Place. Following the departure of Steve Whitmire, he took over the roles of Statler, Link Hogthrob and Lips.

Linz also performed in the Broadway musical Avenue Q, and he also did the voice of Moz in the English dub of Sheep and Wolves and Bug, Pig, and Monkey in the PBS Kids computer-animated television series WordWorld.

Filmography

References

External links
 

1967 births
Living people
Muppet performers
Sesame Street Muppeteers
University of Georgia alumni
American puppeteers